Sofia is home to many art galleries.

The fine art, also called visual arts, is presented to the public in national, municipal or private galleries, as well as on Internet-based galleries. Permanent, temporary, visiting or mixed expositions of Contemporary, Modern and Renaissance art is being presented.

National galleries 
 National Art Gallery (part of the National Gallery);
 Square 500 (part of the National Gallery);
 National Gallery of Foreign Art (part of the National Gallery);
 Sofia Arsenal - Museum of Contemporary Art (part of the National Gallery);
 The crypt of the cathedral St. Alexander Nevsky (part of the National Gallery);
 National Museum of Bulgarian Fine Arts;
 National High School of Applied Arts "St. Luca";
 Museum of the Socialist Art (part of the National Gallery)

State galleries 

 Sredets Gallery - Ministry of Culture;
 Bulgaria Gallery at the Sofia Philharmonic Orchestra; 
 Debut Gallery at the National School of Fine Arts "Ilia Petrov" (High School of Fine Arts); 
 Archives Exhibition Hall, Archives State Agency;
"Mission" Gallery, State Cultural Institute at the Ministry of Foreign Affairs

Galleries at universities 
 “Academia” Gallery at the National Academy of Arts;
 “Art Box Academy” at the National Academy of Arts;
 “Dondukov 56” at the National Academy of Arts;
 “Faculty of Applied Arts - Tsarigradsko shose 73” at the National Academy of Fine Arts;
 “UniArt Gallery" - New Bulgarian University;
 Sofia University "St. Kliment Ohridski" - Alma Mater Gallery

Municipal galleries 
 Sofia City Art Gallery;
 Workshop - "Dechko Uzunov" Gallery;
 Vaska Emanouilova Gallery;
 The Gallery at the Professional High School of Fine Arts “Prof. Nikolay Raynov”

Other public galleries 
 Shipka 6 Str. Gallery, Union of the Bulgarian Artists;
 "Rayko Alexiev" Gallery, Union of the Bulgarian Artists;
 Gallery - bookstore "Sofia Press", Union of the Bulgarian Artists; 
 Gallery at the Union of the Architects in Bulgaria;
 Gallery at the Union of Bulgarian Composers; 
 The Red House - Center for Culture and Debates;
 Gallery Gallery - Router gallery focussed on digital art

Galleries at foreign cultural institutes 
 Instituto Cervantes
 Polish Cultural Institute
 Russian Cultural and Information Center
 Finnish Embassy 
 French Institute

External links 
  National Art Gallery, National Gallery for Foreign Art, Sofia Arsenal and Square 500
  Academy Gallery at the National Academy of Arts
 Sofia City Art Gallery
 Gallery "Shipka 6"
 Gallery "Rayko Alexiev"“
 Gallery Gallery